Monza alberti, the black grass skipper, is a butterfly in the family Hesperiidae. It is found in Senegal, Guinea, Sierra Leone, Liberia, Ivory Coast, Ghana, Nigeria, Cameroon, Gabon, the Republic of the Congo, the Central African Republic, the Democratic Republic of the Congo, Uganda, western Kenya and north-western Tanzania. The habitat consists of forests, including degraded and riverine forests that penetrate Guinea savanna.

Adults are attracted to the flowers of acanthaceous plants.

The larvae feed on Pennisetum species.

References

Butterflies described in 1896
Erionotini
Butterflies of Africa